Nyukawa Dam is a gravity dam located in Gifu Prefecture in Japan. The dam is used for flood control, water supply and power production. The catchment area of the dam is 23 km2. The dam impounds about 32  ha of land when full and can store 6200 thousand cubic meters of water. The construction of the dam was started on 1975 and completed in 2012.

References

Dams in Gifu Prefecture